The State of Wisconsin Investment Board (SWIB), created in 1951, is an independent state agency responsible for managing the assets of the Wisconsin Retirement System , the State Investment Fund (SIF), and other state trust funds. , SWIB managed $165.6 billion in assets.

Edwin Denson was appointed the executive director/chief investment officer in April 2021.

Bonuses 

In December 2016, it was revealed that employees were paid over $11 million in combined bonuses in 2015 when the main funds returns were flat.  This is due to the compensation structure that tracks five year returns due to the long term nature of the investing.  For the five year period, the fund returned 6.7%, which outdid its 6.2% benchmark.  When accounting for roughly $100B of assets under management at the time the 0.5% out-performance equates five hundred million of additional money for the pension system.  This is roughly 45 times the $11mm of bonuses paid to the staff that outperformed the market.

References

External links

Financial services companies established in 1951
Companies based in Madison, Wisconsin
Venture capital firms of the United States
1951 establishments in Wisconsin
Public pension funds in the United States